Limeil-Brévannes is a commune in the southeastern suburbs of Paris, France.

Geography

Climate

Limeil-Brévannes has a oceanic climate (Köppen climate classification Cfb).

Population

Transport
Limeil-Brévannes is served by no station of the Paris Métro, RER, or suburban rail network. The closest station to Limeil-Brévannes is Boissy-Saint-Léger station on Paris RER line A. This station is located in the neighboring commune of Boissy-Saint-Léger,  from the town center of Limeil-Brévannes.

Education
Public primary schools in the commune include 8 preschools/nursery schools (maternelles) and 6 elementary schools, making a total of 13 schools.
 Preschools: Anatole France, André Malraux, Henri Wallon, Jacques Prévert, Jean-Louis Marquèze, Paul Langevin, Pierre Curie, Rosa Luxemburg
 Elementaries: Anatole France, Pablo Picasso, Martine Soulié, Louis Pasteur, Piard, Jean-Louis Marquèze

Public secondary schools:
 Two junior high schools: Collège Daniel Féry and Collège Janusz Korczak
 Lycée Guillaume Budé (senior high school/sixth-form college)

See also
Communes of the Val-de-Marne department

References

External links

 Limeil-Brévannes 

Communes of Val-de-Marne